The Almonte Detachment was a military-operated radio communications receiver station linked by land line to CFS Carp located in Burnt Lands alvar off Lanark County Road 49 East of Almonte, Ontario, Canada.  A second antenna receiver site was located further east near Dunrobin, Ontario; the Dunrobin Detachment. Both of these sites were linked to CFS Carp Richardson Detachment, which was a remote-operated transmitting site. CFS Carp Almonte Detachment was unmanned and the location primarily used as a remote antenna farm.  After the end of the Cold War, CFS Carp was decommissioned and the antenna site was no longer needed.

The land is now part of the Burnt Lands Provincial Park.

References 

Almonte
Military radio systems
1962 establishments in Ontario
1994 disestablishments in Ontario